Rocchetta Tanaro is a comune (municipality) in the Province of Asti in the Italian region Piedmont, located about  southeast of Turin and about  southeast of Asti.

Rocchetta Tanaro borders the following municipalities: Belveglio, Castello di Annone, Cerro Tanaro, Cortiglione, Masio, Mombercelli, and Rocca d'Arazzo.

Demographic evolution

Twin towns — sister cities
Rocchetta Tanaro is twinned with:

  Donnas, Italy (2002)

  Funabashi, Japan (2023)

  Miami-Dade, U.S.A. (2005)

References

External links
 www.comune.rocchettatanaro.at.it